Urmia or Orumiyeh is the largest city in West Azerbaijan Province of Iran and the capital of Urmia County. Lake Urmia, one of the world's largest salt lakes, lies to the east of the city, and the border area with Turkey lies to the west.

Urmia is the 10th-most populous city in Iran. At the 2006 census, its population was 577,307 in 153,570 households. The following census in 2011 counted 667,499 people in 197,749 households. The latest census in 2016 showed a population of 736,224 people in 225,050 households. The majority of the city's residents are Azerbaijanis, with a large minority of Kurds, and a smaller number of Assyrians, and Armenians, as well as Persian-speakers who moved to the city mostly for employment.

The city is the trading center for a fertile agricultural region where fruits (especially apples and grapes) and tobacco are grown. Even though the majority of the residents of Urmia are Muslims, the Christian history of Urmia is well preserved and is especially evident in the city's many churches and cathedrals.

An important town by the 9th century, the city has had a diverse population which has at times included Muslims (Shias and Sunnis), Christians (Catholics, Protestants, Nestorians, and Orthodox), Jews, Baháʼís and Sufis. Around 1900, Christians made up more than 40% of the city's population; however, in the next decades, most of the Christians were either killed as a part of the advancing Ottoman troops and raids by Kurdish tribes or fled shortly after the end of the war.

Etymology 
Richard Nelson Frye suggested Urartian origin for the name, while T. Burrow connected the origin of the name Urmia to Indo-Iranian urmi- "wave" and urmya- "undulating, wavy".

The name could also derive from the combination of the Assyrian Aramaic words Ur (a common name for cities around Mesopotamia, meaning "city") and Mia, "City of Water" referring to the great Lake Urmia nearby. Compare Urhay, Ur of the Chaldees.

Variants and alternatives 
As of 1921, Urmia was also called, Urumia and Urmi. During the Pahlavi Dynasty (1925–1979), the city was called Rezaiyeh after Reza Shah, the dynasty's founder, whose name ultimately derives from the Islamic concept of rida via the Eighth Imam in Twelver Shia Islam, Ali al-Ridha.

In his seyahatname, Evliya Çelebi referred to the city as Rūmiyya, also mentioning that the Mongols called the city Urumiya, Persians Rūmiyya-eh Kubrā, and some historians Turkestān-eh Irān, which he justified by the considerable amount of Turkoman awliya in the city.

Due to the city's contact with many ethnic groups and cultures throughout its history, the name of the city has many linguistic variants:
,  
 
, or Urmu

History 

According to Vladimir Minorsky, there were villages in the Urmia Plain as early as 2000BC, with their civilization under the influence of the Kingdom of Van. Excavations of the ancient ruins near Urmia led to the discovery of utensils that date to the 20thcentury BC. In ancient times, the west bank of Urmia Lake was called Gilzan, and in the 9thcentury BC an independent government ruled there, which later joined the Urartu or Manna empire; in the 8thcentury BC, the area was a vassal of the Asuzh government until it joined the Median Empire.

Assyrians who did survive the invasion of Baghdad by Timur fled through northern Iraq up into the Hakkari Mountains to the west of Lake Urmia and the area remained as their homeland until the 19th century.

During the Safavid era, the neighboring Ottoman Turks, who were the archrivals of the Safavids, made several incursions into the city and captured it on more than one occasion, but the Safavids successfully regained control over the area. When in 1622, during the reign of Safavid king AbbasI (1588–1629) Qasem Sultan Afshar was appointed governor of Mosul, he was forced to leave his office shortly afterwards due to the outbreak of a plague. He moved to the western part of Azerbaijan, and became the founder of the Afshar community of Urmia. The city was the capital of the Urmia Khanate from 1747 to 1865. The first monarch of Iran's Qajar dynasty, Agha Muhammad Khan, was crowned in Urmia in 1795.

Due to the presence of a substantial Christian minority at the end of the 19thcentury, Urmia was also chosen as the site of the first Christian missionaries from the United States in Iran in 1835 led by Justin Perkins (1805–1869) with Asahel Grant (1807–1844); and followed by Fidelia Fiske (1816–1864), Joseph Gallup Cochran (1817–1871), and Joseph Plumb Cochran (1855–1905). Another mission was soon underway in nearby Tabriz as well. During World War I, the population was estimated by Dr.Caujole to be 30,000 people, and a quarter of which (7,500) were Assyrians and 1,000 Jews.

During the 19th century, the region became the center of a short-lived Assyrian renaissance with many books and newspapers being published in Syriac. Urmia was also the seat of a Chaldean diocese.

During late 1914 Ottoman forces under the command of Enver Pasha stepped up clandestine activity in the region with the aim of committing the Ottoman Empire to war. During World War I, the city changed hands several times between the Russians and the Ottoman troops and their Kurdish allies in the following two years. In 1914, before the declaration of war against Russia, Ottoman forces crossed the border into Persia and destroyed Christian villages. Large-scale attacks in late September and October 1914 targeted many Assyrian villages, and the attackers neared Urmia. Due to Ottoman attacks, thousands of Christians living along the border fled to Urmia.

Many Christians fled during the Russian withdrawal from Azerbaijan at the beginning of January 1915, and 20,000 to 25,000 refugees were left stranded in Urmia. Nearly 18,000 Christians sought shelter in the city's Presbyterian and Lazarist missions. Although there was reluctance to attack the missionary compounds, many died of disease. Between February and May (when the Ottoman forces pulled out), there was a campaign of mass execution, looting, kidnapping, and extortion against Christians in Urmia. More than 100 men were arrested at the Lazarist compound, and dozens (including Mar Dinkha, bishop of Tergawer) were executed on 23 and 24 February.

The Russian army advanced later in 1915. After Russia's withdrawal as a result of the 1917 Russian Revolution, about 5,000 Assyrian and Armenian militia policed the area, but they frequently abused their power and killed Muslims without provocation. 

From February to July 1918, the region was engulfed by ethnic violence. On 22 February, local Muslims and the Persian governor began an uprising against the Christian militias in Urmia. The better-organized Christians, led by Agha Petros, brutally crushed the uprising; hundreds (possibly thousands) were killed. On 16 March, Mar Shimun and many of his bodyguards were killed by the Kurdish chieftain Simko Shikak, probably at the instigation of Persian officials fearing Assyrian separatism, after they met to discuss an alliance. Assyrians went on a killing and looting spree; unable to find Simko, they murdered Persian officials and inhabitants. The Kurds responded by massacring Christians, regardless of denomination or ethnicity. Christians were massacred in Salmas in June and in Urmia in early July, and many Assyrian women were abducted. 

Christian militias in Azerbaijan were no match for the Ottoman army when it invaded in July 1918. Tens of thousands of Ottoman and Persian Assyrians fled south to Hamadan, where the British Dunsterforce was garrisoned, on 18 July to escape Ottoman forces approaching Urmia under Ali İhsan Sâbis. The Ottoman invasion was followed by killings of Christians, including Chaldean archbishop Toma Audo, and the sacking of Urmia.

Demographics

Ethnic composition 
The city has been home to various ethnic groups during its history. The population of Urmia in the early Islamic period was Christian. In late 19th century, George Curzon reported a population of 30 to 40 thousand people, chiefly Afshars, Nestorians, Jews, and Armenians, while other sources also referred to an additional Persian community. At the beginning of the 20thcentury, the city had a significant Christian minority (Assyrians and Armenians). According to Macuch, and Ishaya, the city was the spiritual capital of the Assyrians, who were influenced by four Christian missions that had been established in the city in the period from 1830 to the end of World War I. A large number of the Assyrians and Armenians were killed in 1914 during the Armenian and Assyrian genocides, which resulted in a change in the city's demographics. In the fourteenth edition of Encyclopædia Britannica from 1929, the town's population was roughly estimated to be 45 thousand before the war, mainly being Turkish with Armenian and Nestorian minorities.  During the era of Reza Shah Pahlavi, Iranian Assyrians were invited to return to the region, and several thousand did return. There are around 5,000 Assyrians remaining in the city.

Until the Iran crisis of 1946 and the Establishment of the State of Israel in 1947, several thousand Jews also lived Urmia, and their language (Lishán Didán) is still spoken by an ageing community in Israel.

According to the Federal Research Division of Library of Congress, ethnic Azeris form around 40% of the population of Urmia region. The majority of the city's residents are Azerbaijanis, with a large minority of Kurds, and a smaller number of Assyrians, and Armenians, as well as Persian-speakers who moved to the city mostly for employment.

The majority of the population can speak the official language of Iran, Persian, in addition to their own native tongue.

Religion 

The city is the archiepiscopal see of the Eastern Catholic Metropolitan Chaldean Catholic Archeparchy of Urmyā, which has a suffragan in Salmas. There are also Protestants, Church of the East adherents and Armenian Orthodox. There are four churches in the central part of the city, two being Assyrian Church of the East, one Armenian, and one Chaldean.

When 17th-century explorer Evliya Çelebi visited the region, the city's Muslim population was mostly Sunni and not yet converted to Shia Islam. Around 1900, Christians made up more than 40% of the city's population; however, most of the Christians were either killed when the Ottoman Empire invaded Qajar Iran and committed genocide against Urmia's Assyrian and Armenian population or fled shortly after the end of the war. Approximately 15,000 Assyrians reside in northern Iran, in Urmia and various Assyrian villages in the surrounding area. The Christian history of Urmia is well preserved and is especially evident in the city's many churches and cathedrals.

Parks and touristic centres 
The tourist attractions of the city of Urmia include many parks and coastal villages lying on or near the shores of Lake Urmia. The oldest park in Urmia, called Park-e Saat, was established in the first Pahlavi era. Urmia's largest park is Ellar Bagi Park (Azerbaijani "People's Garden") along the Shahar Chayi, or the "City River".

Lakes and ponds
 Urmia Lake Natural Park
 Hasanloo Lake
 Marmisho lake
 Shahrchay ِDam
 Urmia Lake Islands

Lagoons
 Haft Abad
 Soole Dokel
 Dana Boğan
 Ali Pancesi
 Isti Sou

Parks
 Park-e Saat (Clock Park)
 Park-e Jangali (Jungle Park)
 Ellar Bagi (People's Garden)
 Park-e Shahr (City Park)
 Park-e Saheli (Riverside Park)
 Park-e Shaghayegh
 Alghadir Park
 Tokhmemorghi (Oval) Park
 Ghaem Park

Scenic coastal villages:
 Chichest
 Bari
 Fanoos
 Sier
 Band
 Khoshako

Landscape attractions:
 Qasimlu Valley
 Kazem Dashi Islet in Lake Urmia
 Kashtiban Village
 Imamzada Village
 Silvana Region
 Rashekan to Dash Aghol
 Nazloo
 Dalamper
 Kaboodan Island

Climate 
Urmia's climate is cold semi-arid climate (Köppen: BSk, Trewartha: BS), bordering on humid continental climate (Köppen: Dfa, Trewartha: Dc), with cold winters, mild springs, hot dry summers, and cool autumns. Precipitation is heavily concentrated in late autumn, winter (mostly in the form of snow), and especially spring, while precipitation is scarce in summer. Temperatures in Urmia are much colder than most of the remainder of Iran. The drought of Urmia Lake will have a negative impact on the climate of the region.

Being on the downwind and rain shadow side of the Zagros mountains, its winters are relatively drier and less snowier than Hakkari's (to the west) in southeastern Turkey due to the foehn effect.

Sport 

Sports are an important part of Urmia's culture. The most popular sport in Urmia is volleyball. Urmia is considered Iran's volleyball capital, and that is because of the ranks that Shahrdari Urmia VC got in Iranian Volleyball Super League and for the great volleyball players who play on the Iran men's national volleyball team (such as Saed Marouf, Abdolreza Alizadeh, and Milad Ebadipour) and first-class coaches in Iran. Recently, Urmia has also been called "the city of volleyball lovers" by the Fédération Internationale de Volleyball (International Volleyball Federation, FIVB) official website.

The 2010 Asian Men's Cup Volleyball Championship was held in Ghadir Arena in Urmia, 2012 WAFF Futsal Championship, and the 2012 Asian Junior Men's Volleyball Championship was also held in Urmia. It is also one of the venues of the 2019 FIVB Volleyball Men's Nations League.

Culture 

Azerbaijanis hold festivals and ceremonies such as Nowruz and Eid al-Adha like other Iranian ethnic groups with small differences. Ashik music is one of the features of the Turkish speaking people of the world. It has different versions in Iran. Meanwhile, as many experts of this art testify the Urmia Ashik, is the most original and oldest version in the world, which has preserved its origin until the present day. Ashik music has its unique styles. As a piece of the culture of Azerbaijan, Urmia Ashik music has been registered in Iran's national heritage.

Museums
 Natural History Museum – Displays the animals native to the vicinity of Urmia.
 Urmia Museum – Archaeological museum affiliated with the faculty of Shahid Beheshti University.
 Urmia Museum of Crafts and Classical Arts.
 Urmia Museum of َAnthropology.

Education 

The first modern style school established in Urmia in 1834.

Higher education 
Urmia was an important centre for higher education approximately a century ago; indeed, the medical college of Urmia, which was built by Joseph Cochran and a team of American medical associates in 1878, is the first modern university of Iran. Unfortunately, the college was shut down even before the establishment of the first official University of Iran, University of Tehran. Today, Urmia has become an important centre of education, with several state and private universities and institutes, including those listed below.

Universities in Urmia:

Libraries 
 Allame Tabatabayee Library
 Central Library of Urmia
 Library of Ghaem
 Library of I.R. Iran Education Ministry
 Library of Imam Ali
 Library of kanoon parvaresh fekri
 Library of Khane-ye-Javan
 Library of Shahid Motahhari
 Library of Shahid Bahonar
 Library of Urmia Cultural and Artistical Center

Media

Television 
Urmia has one state-owned television channel, Urmia TV, which broadcasts in both Azerbaijani, and Persian, and internationally through satellite Intelsat902.

Radio 
Urmia has one radio channel broadcasting in Kurdish, Azerbaijani and Persian. The name of the local radio is Chichest.

Press 
Among others, the city's print media include: 
 Orumiye
 Barish news 
 Sedaye Urmia
 Amanat
 Koosha
 Araz

Infrastructure

Transportation 
Most of Urmia's residents travel by car through the system of roads and highways. Urmia is also served by taxis and public buses. There are also some private groups that provide services called "Phone-taxi." Two Tram-lines for Urmia are Planned .

Urmia is linked to Europe through Turkey's roads and Sero border crossing. Urmia Airport, which opened in 1964, was the first international airport in West Azerbaijan county, Iran. As of April 2015 it only has regularly scheduled domestic flights to Tehran's Mehrabad International Airport, although there are plans to establish a direct flight between Urmia and Erbil, due to the large number of passengers travelling between the two cities. The city is recently connected to Iran National Railways (IRIR).

Health systems 
The Iranian government operates public hospitals in the Urmia metropolitan region. There are also a number of private hospitals and medical centers in the city. Hospitals include:
Hospitals:
 523 Artesh(Army) Hospital
 Arefian Hospital
 Azerbaijan Hospital
 Gholipour Children's Hospital
 Imam Khomeini Hospital
 Imam Reza Hospital
 Milad international medical center
 Motahari Hospital
 Omid Hospital
 Razi Psychiatry Hospital 
 Taleghani Hospital
 Seyedoshohada Heart Hospital
 Shafa Hospital
 Shams Hospital
 Solati Hospital

Clinics:
 Fatimiye Pro-Medical Clinic
 Kosar Women's Pro-Medical Clinic

Consulates 
The Turkish government has a consulate on Beheshti Avenue.

People 
During its history Urmia was the origin for many Iranian illumination and modernization movements. The city was the hometown of numerous figures including politicians, revolutionaries, artists, and military leaders. Following is a partial list of some of the people who was born or lived in Urmia.

For a complete list see: :Category:People from Urmia

Twin towns and sister cities 
  Erzurum, Turkey (since 2015)

See also 

 Ark of Nuh or Noah
 Assyrian homeland
 Emirate of Bradost
 64th Infantry Division of Urmia
 Russian Ecclesiastical Mission in Urmia
 Teppe Hasanlu
 Urmia Orthodokseta

References

Sources

External links 

 Urmia Branch of Ministry of Internal Affairs

 

Populated places in Urmia County

Assyrian settlements

Iranian provincial capitals

Cities in West Azerbaijan Province

Populated places along the Silk Road